Marathon County is a county located in the U.S. state of Wisconsin. As of the 2020 census, the population was 138,013. Marathon County's seat is Wausau. It was founded in 1850, created from a portion of Portage County. At that time the county stretched to the northern border with the upper Michigan peninsula. It is named after the battlefield at Marathon, Greece.

Marathon County comprises the Wausau, WI Metropolitan Statistical Area and is included in the Wausau-Stevens Point-Wisconsin Rapids, WI Combined Statistical Area.

Geography
It is the largest county in Wisconsin by land area and fourth-largest by total area.

The Marathon County Park Commission has posted a geographical marker that identifies the spot  (45°N, 90°W) of the exact center of the northern half of the Western Hemisphere, meaning that it is a quarter of the way around the world from the Prime Meridian and halfway from the Equator to the North Pole.

Major highways
  Interstate 39
  US Highway 51
  Wisconsin Highway 13
  Wisconsin Highway 29
  Wisconsin Highway 34
  Wisconsin Highway 49
  Wisconsin Highway 52
  Wisconsin Highway 97
  Wisconsin Highway 107
  Wisconsin Highway 153

Railroads
Canadian National
Watco

Buses
Metro Ride
List of intercity bus stops in Wisconsin

Airports
 KAUW - Wausau Downtown Airport
 KCWA - Central Wisconsin Airport

Adjacent counties

 Lincoln County - north
 Langlade County - northeast
 Shawano County - east
 Waupaca County - southeast
 Portage County - south
 Wood County - south
 Clark County - west
 Taylor County - northwest

Natural wildlife refuges
 Mead Wildlife Area

Demographics

2020 census
As of the census of 2020, the population was 138,013. The racial makeup of the county was 86.9% White, 6.2% Asian, 0.9% Black or African American, 0.5% Native American, 1.3% from other races, and 4.3% from two or more races. Ethnically, the population was 3.2% Hispanic or Latino of any race.

2000 census
As of the census of 2000, there were 125,834 people, 47,702 households, and 33,868 families residing in the county. The population density was 81 people per square mile (31/km2). There were 50,360 housing units at an average density of 33 per square mile (13/km2). The racial makeup of the county was 93.84% White, 0.28% Black or African American, 0.35% Native American, 4.54% Asian, 0.02% Pacific Islander, 0.26% from other races, and 0.72% from two or more races. 0.78% of the population were Hispanic or Latino of any race. 52.6% were of German and 13.6% Polish ancestry. 92.9% spoke English, 3.4% Hmong, 1.1% German and 1.1% Spanish as their first language.

There were 47,702 households, out of which 34.00% had children under the age of 18 living with them, 59.90% were married couples living together, 7.40% had a female householder with no husband present, and 29.00% were non-families. 23.60% of all households were made up of individuals, and 9.50% had someone living alone who was 65 years of age or older. The average household size was 2.60 and the average family size was 3.11.

In the county, the population was spread out, with 26.80% under the age of 18, 8.20% from 18 to 24, 29.50% from 25 to 44, 22.50% from 45 to 64, and 13.00% who were 65 years of age or older. The median age was 36 years. For every 100 females, there were 99.50 males. For every 100 females aged 18 and over, there were 97.40 males.

Libraries
The Marathon County Public Library (MCPL) has its headquarters in downtown Wausau, Wisconsin. Eight branch libraries have been established in the cities of Athens, Edgar, Hatley, Marathon City, Mosinee, Rothschild, Spencer, and Stratford.

Recreation

County parks

 Amco County Park
 Big Eau Pleine County Park
 Big Rapids County Park
 Bluegill Bay County Park
 Cherokee County Park
 Courthouse Square
 D.C. Everest County Park
 Dells of the Eau Claire County Park
 Duane L. Corbin Shooting Range Park
 Library Park
 Marathon Park
 Mission Lake County Park
 Mountain-Bay State Park Trail
 Reitbrock Geographical Marker
 Rib Falls County Park
 Sunny Vale County Park

Snowmobile trails
There are over 884 miles of groomed snowmobile trails in Marathon County maintained by 29 area snowmobile clubs.

Politics

See also
 National Register of Historic Places listings in Marathon County, Wisconsin

References

External links

 Marathon County
 Libraries and Schools in Marathon and Lincoln Counties - Digital collection of historic images and texts on schools and libraries in Marathon and Lincoln Counties

 
1850 establishments in Wisconsin
Populated places established in 1850